Frank Oliver Evans was a British Able Seaman of the  as part of its Deck Crew. He was known for being a survivor of the ship as well as being one of 18 crew members of the lifeboat drill.

Military career
Evans was born on 15 May 1884 at Naphill, Buckinghamshire as one of twelve children of Joseph Evans and Mary Elliot. Around this time, Evans was described as while having good characteristics, he often got himself into trouble and was arrested at least three times for several misdemeanours.

Merchant career and the Titanic
Evans remained out of any naval service until 1911 when Evans decided to join the Merchant Navy and was chosen to work at the Union-Castle Line within HMHS Tintagel Castle and the  Ferneo and the Olympic of the White Star Line. Unlike most crew of the Titanic, Evans had recognized his assigned lifeboat due to taking part in the lifeboat trill training prior to the sinking. Evans was at the Forward Mess Hall on the C Deck when the Sinking of the Titanic had occurred. Evans was ordered to find the Carpenter and sound all the wells forward but after failing to find the Carpenter, he found Boatswain Alfred Nichols and along with other crew members, he helped uncover port side boats and lowering Lifeboat's 1 and 12 before being ordered to board Lifeboat 10 by William McMaster Murdoch, joining with Edward John Buley.

Within the water, Lifeboat 10 pulled 200 yards away from the Titanic and managed to unite with Lifeboats 4, 12, 14 and D. Evans reported seeing the Titanic split into two between the 3rd and 4th funnels. Evans was then ordered by Harold Lowe to transfer to Lifeboat 14 and later returned to the Titanic in an attempt to find any remaining survivors. Evans searched at Collapsible B and A but later testified that he was unable to search underwater due to fears of becoming unnerved and having a breakdown.

Later years
Evans continued to work as a merchant sailor during the 1920s, serving in World War I and in World War II. After being made a quartermaster, he served on the Mississippi, San Jeronimo and the Trinculo. After the inquiry, Evans rarely talked about his involvement in the Titanic as the events had traumatized him. He never married and retired at London and spent his final days at Ruislip, Middlesex. He died at the Hillingdon Hospital on 19 May 1952 and was buried at the Northwood Cemetery in an unmarked grave.

References

1884 births
1962 deaths
19th-century English people
20th-century English people
Royal Navy sailors
RMS Titanic survivors
British Merchant Service personnel of World War I
British Merchant Navy personnel of World War II